Cumulative inequality theory or Cumulative Disadvantage Theory is the systematic explanation of how inequalities develop. The theory was initially developed by Merton in 1988, who studied the sciences and prestige. He believed that recognition from peers, and from published research in the scientific field created cumulative advantage or also Matthew effect that led to the receipt of resources that facilitated research projects. The theory expanded in four decades to include the idea that some people have more disadvantages than advantages which influence the quality of life of societies, cohorts, and individuals.  The theory is principally a social scientific explanation of phenomena but with links to biological and health factors, personal adjustment, and well-being.  A central premise is that "social systems generate inequality, which is manifested over the life course via demographic and developmental processes."
Cumulative Inequality and Cumulative advantage/disadvantage(CAD) are two different but interrelated theories but Cumulative Inequality has drawn from various theoretical traditions including CAD.

Development and application 

The ideas of this theory were developed by Kenneth Ferraro and colleagues as an integrative or middle-range theory.  Originally specified in five axioms and nineteen propositions, cumulative inequality theory incorporates elements from the following theories and perspectives, several of which are related to the study of society:
Robert Merton articulated the Matthew effect to explain accumulating advantage 
Glen Elder's life course perspective 
Stress process theory 
Age stratification theory.

In recent years, Ferraro and several other researchers have been testing and elaborating elements of the theory on a variety of topics to provide evidence for the theoretical framework. In the following information you will find some of the uses of this theory in sociological studies.

McDonough, Worts, Booker, et al (2015) for example studied cumulative disadvantage in the generations of health inequality among mothers in Britain and the United States.  The study examined   "if adverse circumstances early in the life course cumulate as health harming biographical patterns across working and family caregiving years."  Also, it was examined if institutional context moderated cumulative effects of micro level processes. The results showed that existing health disparities of women in midlife, during work and family rearing time, were intensified by cumulative disadvantages caused by adversities in early life. Thus, the accumulation of disadvantage had negative connotations for the well-being of women's occupational experiences and family life.

McLean (2010), on the other hand, studied U.S combat and non combat veterans through cumulative disadvantage. He discovered that cumulated negative disadvantages caused by disability and unemployment were more likely to influence the lives of combat veterans versus non combat veterans. Combat veterans suffered physical and emotional trauma that had a disabling effect which impeded their ability to successfully obtain employment. . The research is crucial for social policy implementation that assist United States Veterans to find and retain employment that is suitable to their personal conditions.

In continuation, Woolredge, Frank, Coulette, et al. ( 2016) studied the prison sentencing of racial groups. specifically of African American males with prior felony convictions. They examined how pre-trial processes affect trial outcomes. It was determined that cumulative disadvantage was existent for African American males and young men; the results were measured by: set bail amounts, pre-trial detention, prison sentencing, and no reduction in sentencing length. The research are striving to create changes in the justice system that reduce incarceration rates of African American Males by reducing bail amounts, and pre trial imprisonment. Further studies are important to decrease the incarceration of minority groups in society, and to create a non biased justice system.
 
Additionally, Ferraro & Moore (2003) have applied the theory to the study of long-term consequences of early obesity for midlife health and socioeconomic attainment. The study shows that obesity experienced in early life leads to lower-body disability, but higher risk factors to health. Moreover. The research mentions a risk that has been brought to attention in the past years; it ties being over weight to negative stigma (DeJong 1980),and has influenced fair labor market positioning and wages.

Lastly, Crystal, Shea, & Reyes (2016) studied the effects of cumulative advantage in increasing within age cohort economic inequalities in diverse periods of time. The study utilized economic patterns such as annual wealth value and household size. The inequalities of age were analyzed by using the gini coefficient.  The study took place between 1980 and 2010. The results showed that at age 65 plus individuals had higher rates of inequality and it increased significantly for baby boomers or during economic recession and times of war. The research is written to estimate the possible impacts of social security changes on older adults in American Society.

In conclusion, Cumulative Inequality or Cumulative Disadvantage Theory, is broadly examining various topics that impact public policy, and the view of our role within society. Further benefits of the theory are still to be seen in the next coming years.

Core ideas 

According to Ferraro and Shippee, there are five main ideas in cumulative inequality or Cumulative Disadvantage Theory, which include:

"Axiom 1: Social systems generate inequality, which is manifested over the life course through demographic and developmental processes.
Axiom 2:  Disadvantage increases exposure to risk, but advantage increases exposure to opportunity.
Axiom 3: Life course trajectories are shaped by the accumulation of risk, available resources, and human agency.
Axiom 4:  The perception of life trajectories influences subsequent trajectories
Axiom 5:  Cumulative inequality may lead to premature mortality; therefore, nonrandom selection may give the appearance of decreasing inequality in later life."

Axiom 1 
Ferraro, K.F., & Shippee, T.P. (2009) stated that social structures shape human behavior and interpersonal relations. Furthermore, cumulation in childhood experiences shape life outcomes sometimes in negative ways.  Inequality is, therefore,  not a randomly determined misfortune, but rather a predestined state that one is born into. Although it is possible for inequality to come from an individual's own actions consequences, that is not always true. One's childhood experiences and conditions should also be taken into consideration since these experiences help mold a young individual into an adult.

Axiom 2 
Ferraro, K.F., & Shippee, T.P. (2009) want us to consider that cumulative advantage and disadvantage are not different they are merely opposite ends of the spectrum. Cumulative Disadvantage is perceived as a risk whereas Cumulative Advantage is an opportunity. 
A well-known concept in sociological sources is that individuals with advantages, whether they are achieved or born into, have a higher rate of opportunity in life. On the contrary, those with many disadvantages are more susceptible to risks throughout their life. For example, one who is born into the majority race with well-educated parents in a developed area will have more exposure to opportunity, whether it be getting a job through one of their parents' college friends or going to a highly rated high school and then being able to get into a highly accredited college. But, on the contrary, one who is born into a minority race with parents who may not have finished high school and live in the ghettos of the roughest town in the city may, not only have less exposure to opportunities, but more exposure to risks such as violence and crime.

Axiom 3 
Ferraro, K.F., & Shippee, T.P. (2009) state that even though previous life events are important, the overall quality of life is determined by frequently changing trajectories, or the long-term changes in life stability, which are created by an individual's resources, risks, and human agencies. Human agencies simply refer to an individual's own ability to act and think on their own based on their own morals and beliefs. Elder & Shanahan (2006) however, believe that people's responses to stimuli determines changes to the trajectory of life. Moreover, the involvement of the institution in the decision-making process also alters individual decisions and behaviors.

Axiom 4 
Carstensen (2006) makes the inference that ones view on everyday situations and 
success outcomes is more influential than their actual life status when it comes to their subsequent actions. Drawing from social comparison and symbolic interaction theories, a person's view of their resources may be different from what actually exists, and therefore shapes life trajectories in unique ways. People's view of their lives play a huge role into how they continue their trajectory through the decisions they make, and the activities they choose to partake in. Therefore, the theory makes the claim that those who possess a more positive and optimistic outlook on life typically are more satisfied with their life course.

Axiom 5 
Ferraro, K.F., & Shippee, T.P. (2009) stated that before starting to explain Axiom 5, researchers should avoid cohort inversion. It will limit cohort centered studies, specifically, as it refers to the use of non random sample selection that excludes individuals with greater health issues from the samples. Studying individuals of certain age in this case, older adults, may lead to skewed data if selection of only healthier older adults takes place. The mean concentration of results will be designed to a specific population which will limit the data from being externally valid. The axiom may seem hard to understand at first but the overall meaning is that the accumulation of disadvantages can lead to premature mortality, or in simpler terms, younger death. Also, nonrandom selection may make it seem like mortality rates are decreasing when they are not. Take for example the number of young people deaths in areas with high crime and violence. These individuals are not exposed to many advancing opportunities so they fall victim of the cumulative inequality theory. The nonrandom selection component of the axiom signifies how older populations age in a manner that is not totally random, but rather as a result of the advantages and disadvantages that they have gathered throughout their life. An example is exceptional health care throughout life which prolonged lifespan, or, on the contrary, prolonged exposure to toxic chemicals as a result of working in dangerous environments.

Sources

Further reading

Social theories
Matthew effect